Mbiriizi is a town in the southern part of the Central Region of Uganda. It is the administrative center of Lwengo District.

Location
The coordinates of the town are 00 23 33S, 31 27 30E  (Latitude: -0.3927; Longitude:31.4585).

Overview
The town lies along the Masaka-Mbarara Road which connects to Kampala, Uganda's capital to the east and Kigali, the capital city of Rwanda to the southwest.

Points of interest
The following points of interest lie within the town limits or near the town edges: (a) The headquarters of Lwengo District Administration (b) Finance Trust Bank (c) Offices of Lwengo Town Council (d) Offices of Electoral Commission Lwengo District (e) Masaka-Mbarara Road, which passes through the middle of town in a general east/west direction (f) Mbiriizi Advanced Primary School.

See also
 List of cities and towns in Uganda

References

External links

Populated places in Central Region, Uganda
Cities in the Great Rift Valley
Lwengo District